Champion is an American brand of spark plug.

Champion is a longtime sponsor of various racing events, cars, and series including two series run under sanctioning by IMSA.

History

Founding and early history 

Albert Champion Company was founded by Albert Champion in June 1905 in Boston's South End, in the landmark Cyclorama Building, to import French electrical parts, including Nieuport components. Champion presided as president of the Albert Champion Company with partners Frank D. Stranahan as treasurer and younger brother Spencer Stranahan as clerk. By 1907, The Albert Champion Company was manufacturing porcelain spark plugs with the name Champion stamped on the side, Robert Stranahan, the youngest of the Stranahan brothers, finished his classes at Harvard, ahead of his class of 1908, and went to work in the stockroom.

Champion was not happy in his job because he had no control over his work. In 1908, he went to see William C. Durant of the Buick Motor Co. Durant asked to see some of his prototypes. Buick at that time was using Rajah spark plugs. Durant thought they could manufacture spark plugs to Champion's design cheaper than buying them from Rajah, and set Champion up in a workshop in Flint, Michigan. Champion went to work producing spark plugs to be used in Buick automobiles. Champion and Durant formed another company with the Champion name, "Champion Ignition Co." that very shortly later, the Stranahan brothers from "Champion Spark Plug Co." informed them they could not use the name "Champion" as they had it trademarked. Later that year, the name of second company founded by Durant and Champion was changed to "AC Spark Plug" to reflect Albert Champion's initials.

In 1910, the company moved to Toledo, Ohio to be close to the Willys-Overland Auto Company.

In 1931, Champion introduced its first suppressor-type spark plugs. It used a carbon-based resistor to reduce the effects of ignition noise on radio waves.

"Coso artifact" discovery 

On February 13, 1961, two geode prospectors discovered a metal artifact encased in hard clay near the town of Olancha, California. The artifact was dubbed "Coso artifact" due to alleged claims that there were fossils in the clay that were 500,000 years old, which would make the item an out-of-place artifact. The object turned out to be a Champion spark plug from the 1920s.

Following acquisition by Cooper Industries 
In 1989, Champion was purchased by Cooper Industries and is now a wholly owned brand of Federal-Mogul Corporation. Its main products are a line of spark plugs for a wide range of cars, trucks, SUVs, racing and marine applications. Also included in the brand, depending on the regional market and brand history, are spark plug wires, wiper blades, batteries, oil filters, lighting, and glow plugs.

Image gallery

In popular culture 
A character, Cliff Booth, portrayed by Brad Pitt in Quentin Tarantino's 2019 film Once Upon a Time in Hollywood wore a Champion shirt, briefly causing it to become a fashion statement in 2019.

See also
 Champion Spark Plug Hour

References

External links
 

1908 establishments in Ohio
Auto parts suppliers of the United States
Companies based in Toledo, Ohio
Manufacturing companies based in Ohio
Manufacturing companies established in 1908
Spark plugs